This is a list of notable alumni of the Sigma Chi Fraternity. Many notable Sigma Chi Brothers are awarded the Significant Sig Award by headquarters, indicated by as superscriptS.

Athletics and sports entertainment

Baseball

Basketball

Football

Golf

Other

Politics and government
Those with careers spanning multiple categories are usually included with their highest or most prestigious office.

President of the United States

United States Cabinet and White House staff

Justices and attorneys

United States Senate

United States House of Representatives

Governors and Lieutenant Governors of U.S. states

Other U.S. state offices

Ambassadors

Canadian politics

Other government positions

Military

U.S. astronauts

Entertainment and media
Those with careers spanning multiple categories are usually included in the category they are best known for.

Authors

News personalities

Television and film actors

Music

Film and television production

Radio

Other

Business and Technology

Medicine

Education

Non-profit

Theology

Notes 
S- Has been awarded the Significant Sig Award

References

External links
 Official Sigma Chi website
 List of Significant Sigs

Sigma Chi
Lists of members of United States student societies